Giulio Rosati (Rome 1857 – Rome 1917) was an Italian painter who specialized in Orientalist and academic scenes.

Biography

Giulio Rosati was born in Rome in 1861 into a family of bankers and militarists. He did not follow his family's career and instead studied art at the Accademia di San Luca under Dario Querci and Francesco Podesti. He also studied with Luis Álvarez y Catalá (1836-1901), director of the Prado Museum, Madrid. He worked mainly in watercolor, and occasionally in oil, and focussed most of his entire painting career on Orientalist art. He devoted himself particularly to representations of the Maghreb, that he never visited himself. His painting, Oriental Scene was exhibited at the Exposition di Belle Arte, in Rome in 1900.

He was part of a large group of painters, who at the time were depicting similar Middle Eastern subject matter. He became one of the most prolific Orientalist painters of the 19th century. Unlike other Orientalists, he never journeyed to the Middle East.  He rarely participated in exhibitions, preferring to sell his works directly through art dealers.

His son, Alberto Rosati (1893–1971), was also an Orientalist painter. However, his son was far less productive than his father.

Notable paintings

 Picking the Favourite (1880)
 Arab Horsemen Conversing with Carpet Merchant 
 Bedouins Preparing a Combat Patrol (1895)
 The Inspection of the New Arrivals 
 A Discussion in the Desert 
 A Horseman stopping at a Bedouin Camp
 Circassian Beauties Being Inspected
 Gossiping
 Arms Dealers 
 The Backgammon Players
 The Chess Players
 The Carpet Merchant
 The Tric Trac Players
 Dancing in the Harem 
 The Musicians
 The Wedding 
 The Slave Market

Gallery

See also

List of Orientalist artists
Orientalism

References

19th-century Italian painters
Italian male painters
20th-century Italian painters
Orientalist painters
Painters from Rome
1857 births
1917 deaths
19th-century Italian male artists
20th-century Italian male artists